Broad Meadow is a suburb of Newcastle-under-Lyme in Staffordshire, England.

Populated places in Staffordshire
Newcastle-under-Lyme